Boniperti is an Italian surname. Notable people with the surname include:

 Giampiero Boniperti (1928–2021), Italian footballer
 Filippo Boniperti (born 1991), Italian footballer

Italian-language surnames